Austrian Australians are Australian citizens of Austrian national origin or ancestry, or a permanent residents of Australia who have migrated from Austria. There are thousands of Austrian Australians, with many tracing their history to ancestors who arrived in the gold rush during the 1850s. Others came in the aftermath of World War I; during the war, non-naturalised Austro-Hungarians in Australia were interned. The 1920 Immigration Act prevented the arrival of more Austrians, and by 1933 just 286 Austria-born people were present in Victoria alone.

In World War II, and following the Nazi take-over of Austria, a sizeable number of Austrian Jews fled towards Australia. By 1942, there were over 2,000 Austrian Jews throughout the country. The number of Austrians living in the state of Victoria peaked in the 1960s at 8,615, then declined in the decades to come. As of 2006, a total of 4,913 Austrian-born Victorians were recorded.

In terms of religion, most are Roman Catholic, followed by Irreligion.

History

Notable people

See also 
 Australia–Austria relations
 German Australians

References

 
 
Australia
European Australian
Immigration to Australia